A corrosive material is a liquid or solid that causes full thickness destruction of human skin at the site of contact within a specified period of time. A liquid that has a severe corrosion rate on steel or aluminum based on the criteria in 49CFR 173.137(c)(2) is also a corrosive material.

Divisions

454 kg (1001 lbs) or more gross weight of a corrosive material. Although the corrosive class includes both acids and bases, the hazardous materials load and segregation chart does not make any reference to the separation of various incompatible corrosive materials from each other. In spite of this, however, when shipping corrosives, care should be taken to ensure that incompatible corrosive materials can not become mixed, as many corrosives react very violently if mixed. If responding to a transportation incident involving corrosive materials (especially a mixture of corrosives), caution should be exercised.

Placards

Compatibility Table

Packing Groups

References

49 CFR 173.136

Corrosive Substances